James W. Larrabee (1839 – December 30, 1907) was a soldier in the Union Army and a Medal of Honor recipient for his actions during the Siege of Vicksburg in the American Civil War.

Larrabee joined the 55th Illinois Infantry in October 1861, and was mustered out in August 1865.

Medal of Honor citation
Rank and organization: Corporal, Company I, 55th Illinois Infantry. Place and date: At Vicksburg, Miss., May 22, 1863. Entered service at: Mendota, Ill. Birth: Rensselaer County, N.Y. Date of issue: September 2, 1893.

Medal of Honor and his portrait are available for viewing here

Citation:

See also
List of American Civil War Medal of Honor recipients: A–F

Notes

References

External links

1839 births
1907 deaths
United States Army Medal of Honor recipients
Union Army soldiers
People from Rensselaer County, New York
People of New York (state) in the American Civil War
American Civil War recipients of the Medal of Honor